Tomáš Čáp (born 21 November 1978 in Hranice na Moravě) is a Czech footballer. In Austria, Čáp played for the Kärnten in the 3rd Division, called "Regionalliga Mitte", from July 18, 2008. His contract finished March 3, 2009.

External links
 

1978 births
Living people
Czech footballers
Czech expatriate footballers
Czech First League players
Czech National Football League players
FK Jablonec players
SK Kladno players
Association football midfielders
FK Mladá Boleslav players
MFK Vítkovice players
FK Senica players
Slovak Super Liga players
Expatriate footballers in Slovakia
Czech expatriate sportspeople in Slovakia